Haselgrund is a former Verwaltungsgemeinschaft ("collective municipality") in the district Schmalkalden-Meiningen, in Thuringia, Germany. The seat of the Verwaltungsgemeinschaft was in Viernau. It was disbanded in January 2019.

The Verwaltungsgemeinschaft Haselgrund consisted of the following municipalities:
Altersbach 
Bermbach 
Oberschönau
Rotterode 
Unterschönau 
Viernau

References

Former Verwaltungsgemeinschaften in Thuringia